Faithorn Township is a civil township of Menominee County in the U.S. state of Michigan. The population was 214 at the 2000 census.

Geography

Demographics
As of the census of 2000, there were 214 people, 91 households, and 63 families residing in the township.  The population density was 4.0 per square mile (1.5/km2).  There were 207 housing units at an average density of 3.9 per square mile (1.5/km2).  The racial makeup of the township was 99.53% White, and 0.47% from two or more races. Hispanic or Latino of any race were 0.93% of the population.

There were 91 households, out of which 24.2% had children under the age of 18 living with them, 64.8% were married couples living together, 3.3% had a female householder with no husband present, and 29.7% were non-families. 25.3% of all households were made up of individuals, and 11.0% had someone living alone who was 65 years of age or older.  The average household size was 2.35 and the average family size was 2.81.

In the township the population was spread out, with 21.0% under the age of 18, 5.6% from 18 to 24, 27.1% from 25 to 44, 30.8% from 45 to 64, and 15.4% who were 65 years of age or older.  The median age was 43 years. For every 100 females, there were 120.6 males.  For every 100 females age 18 and over, there were 116.7 males.

The median income for a household in the township was $41,250, and the median income for a family was $44,583. Males had a median income of $36,875 versus $30,000 for females. The per capita income for the township was $20,422.  About 2.9% of families and 4.3% of the population were below the poverty line, including none of those under the age of 18 and 18.4% of those 65 and older.

References

Townships in Menominee County, Michigan
Marinette micropolitan area
Townships in Michigan